The Studio Theatre is a non-profit theater production company located in the 14th Street corridor of Washington, D.C. It produces contemporary plays in a four-stage complex. Stages include the Metheny, the Mead and Milton, and Stage 4, a black box.

History

In 1988, the Studio Theatre started its "2nd Stage" production series to provide opportunities for emerging and established local and national artists to share their talents.

Facilities
Studio Theatre contains three main venues: the Metheny, the Mead, and the Milton.  All three are thrust stages and seat approximately 200 people each. They were designed by co-founder Russell Metheny "to foster an intimate connection between actor and audience". The fourth venue, Stage 4, is a flexible black box theater, used primarily for the former Studio 2ndStage and most recently Studio X.

Notable events
Washingtonian magazine, as part of its 50th anniversary commemoration, identified the Studio Theatre's move into its current space at 14th and P streets as one of "50 Moments That Shaped Washington, DC".

Awards
Studio Theatre has been nominated for a total of 321 Helen Hayes Awards, winning 65 awards.

2015 Helen Hayes Awards
 Outstanding Lead Actress in a Musical - HELEN Production - Barbara Walsh in Carrie
 Outstanding Play- HAYES Production - Cock by Mike Bartlett
2014 Helen Hayes Awards
 The James MacArthur Award for Outstanding Supporting Actor, Resident Play - Ted van Griethuysen in The Apple Family Cycle
2013 Helen Hayes Awards
 Outstanding Director, Resident Play - Christopher McElroen, Invisible Man
 Outstanding Ensemble, Resident Play - Invisible Man
 Outstanding Lighting Design, Resident Production - Mary Louise Geiger, Invisible Man
2012 Helen Hayes Awards
 Outstanding Lead Actress, Resident Play - Erica Sullivan in Venus in Fur
 Outstanding Supporting Actor, Resident Musical - Matthew Delorenzo in POP!

Other activities

See also

References

External links

 Official website
 Studio Theatre records, Special Collections in Performing Arts, University of Maryland Libraries.
 Entry for the Studio Theatre in The Washington Post's "Going Out Guide," archived from 2009

Arts organizations established in 1978
Theatre companies in Washington, D.C.
1978 establishments in Washington, D.C.
Regional theatre in the United States
Theatres in Washington, D.C.
Members of the Cultural Alliance of Greater Washington
League of Washington Theatres